Villavega is municipality located in the province of Palencia, Castile and León, Spain.
It is placed in the confluence between two comarcas, Tierra de Campos and Vega-Valdavia. This little village is in the left side of the Valdavia river.

The village is built around its main road Calle Real, which comes from an extension of an old way that has its start in Santa Cruz de Boedo. In the last years, this village has grown thanks to a new piece of land which was said to be developable.

Local economy 
Agriculture and animal breeding.

History 

Villavega was first named in an ancient quote of Castrillo de Villavega. It was named in Alfonso VIII´s last will, in 1204, about 300 years after the establishment of this monument when this monarch ordered the delivery of the castle to the institution named as Orden Militar de San Juan de Jerusalem also known as Orden del Hospital, which was in charge of the security in this area.

According to the historian Gonzalo Martínez Díez, during the Middle Ages Villavega belonged to Meryndat de Monçon. However, this information does not appear in the book Becerro de las Behetrías de Castilla.

Patrimony

San Andres Apostol Church 

The church is of Romanesque origin. In the front side of the church there is a picture of a head, sculpted in stone. There are also two little quotations sculpted in the stone. The first and the biggest one says:

And the little one below:

Although the outside shows a Renaissance style, the inside is in a Romanesque style from the 12th and 13th centuries. There are two pictures from the 12th and 13th centuries. One of the pictures shows Santa Bárbara and the other San Sebastián. These pictures and some silver objects were removed from the church in 1980. They were recovered some years later.

Osario deciochesco 

It is placed outside the church. It is just a building with three pillars and decorated with skulls and inscriptions talking about how short life is. Between each pillar there is a hole which gives access to the inside part of the ossuary. Beginning from the left side, the inscriptions say:

References 
Villavega, Spain
Paramos y Valles: Castrillo de Villavega
Robo en la Iglesia de Villavega

Image gallery 

Municipalities in the Province of Palencia